Culver Academies is a college preparatory boarding school located in Culver, Indiana, which is composed of three entities: Culver Military Academy (CMA) for boys, Culver Girls Academy (CGA), and the Culver Summer Schools and Camps (CSSC). Culver Military Academy was founded in 1894 by Henry Harrison Culver.

Facilities

The Eugene C. Eppley Foundation donated the funds for three classroom buildings that comprise the Gignilliat Memorial Quadrangle. Eppley Auditorium, built  in 1959, seats 1,492 people. The new Steinbrenner Performing Arts Center consists of a scene shop, dance studio, and private dance studio.

Culver Academies was expanded with the addition of the 47,000 sq. ft. Huffington Library on October 1, 1993. The building provides a southern terminus to the academic quadrangle while affording library patrons a view of Lake Maxinkuckee. It houses a collection of approximately 55,000 volumes and the academies' information technology resources.

Henderson Arena is home to Culver Military Academy and Culver Girls Academy hockey teams.

On October 5, 2012, Culver dedicated the White-Devries Rowing Center for the men's and women's crew teams.

On February 9, 2022, it was announced that Culver Military Academy alumnus George Roberts '62 has donated $65 million to the construction of Roberts Residential Quadrangle that will replace the existing Main, North, and East barracks.

Notable alumni and faculty

See also
Skyland Camp-Bowman Lake Ranger Station in Glacier National Park, built by the Culver Military Academy
Delmar T. Spivey, superintendent, 1956–1967 
List of high schools in Indiana

Notes

External links
Official website
The Association of Boarding Schools profile

Boarding schools in Indiana
Educational institutions established in 1894
Military high schools in the United States
Private high schools in Indiana
Schools in Marshall County, Indiana
Summer camps in Indiana
Preparatory schools in Indiana
1894 establishments in Indiana